Crest factor is a parameter of a waveform, such as alternating current or sound, showing the ratio of peak values to the effective value. In other words, crest factor indicates how extreme the peaks are in a waveform. Crest factor 1 indicates no peaks, such as direct current or a square wave. Higher crest factors indicate peaks, for example sound waves tend to have high crest factors.

Crest factor is the peak amplitude of the waveform divided by the RMS value of the waveform.  

The peak-to-average power ratio (PAPR) is the peak amplitude squared (giving the peak power) divided by the RMS value squared (giving the average power). It is the square of the crest factor.

When expressed in decibels, crest factor and PAPR are equivalent, due to the way decibels are calculated for power ratios vs amplitude ratios.

Crest factor and PAPR are therefore dimensionless quantities.  While the crest factor is defined as a positive real number, in commercial products it is also commonly stated as the ratio of two whole numbers, e.g., 2:1. The PAPR is most used in signal processing applications. As it is a power ratio, it is normally expressed in decibels (dB). The crest factor of the test signal is a fairly important issue in loudspeaker testing standards; in this context it is usually expressed in dB.

The minimum possible crest factor is 1, 1:1 or 0 dB.

Examples 
This table provides values for some normalized waveforms. All peak magnitudes have been normalized to 1.

Notes:
 Crest factors specified for QPSK, QAM, WCDMA are typical factors needed for reliable communication, not the theoretical crest factors which can be larger.

Crest factor reduction 

Many modulation techniques have been specifically designed to have constant envelope modulation, i.e., the minimum possible crest factor of 1:1.

In general, modulation techniques that have smaller crest factors usually transmit more bits per second than modulation techniques that have higher crest factors. This is because:
 any given linear amplifier has some "peak output power"—some maximum possible instantaneous peak amplitude it can support and still stay in the linear range;
 the average power of the signal is the peak output power divided by the crest factor;
 the number of bits per second transmitted (on average) is proportional to the average power transmitted (Shannon–Hartley theorem).
Orthogonal frequency-division multiplexing (OFDM) is a very promising modulation technique; perhaps its biggest problem is its high crest factor. Many crest factor reduction techniques (CFR) have been proposed for OFDM. The reduction in crest factor results in a system that can either transmit more bits per second with the same hardware, or transmit the same bits per second with lower-power hardware (and therefore lower electricity costs and less expensive hardware), or both.

Crest factor reduction methods
Various methods for crest factor reduction exist, such as peak windowing, noise shaping, pulse injection and peak cancellation.

Applications 
 Electrical engineering — for describing the quality of an AC power waveform
 Vibration analysis — for estimating the amount of impact wear in a bearing
 Radio and audio electronics — for estimating the headroom required in a signal chain
 Music has a widely varying crest factor.
 Physiology — for analysing the sound of snoring

See also 
 Clipping (signal processing)
 Form factor (electronics)

References

General

External links 
 Definition of peak-to-average ratio – ATIS (Alliance for Telecommunications Industry Solutions) Telecom Glossary 2K
 Definition of crest factor – ATIS (Alliance for Telecommunications Industry Solutions) Telecom Glossary 2K
 Peak-to-average power ratio (PAPR) of OFDM systems - tutorial

Waveforms